Nikita Andreyevich Tryamkin (born 30 August 1994) is a Russian professional ice hockey defenceman. He is currently playing for the Avtomobilist Yekaterinburg of the Kontinental Hockey League (KHL).

Tryamkin made his Kontinental Hockey League (KHL) debut playing with Avtomobilist Yekaterinburg during the 2012–13 KHL season.

Playing career
During the 2014 NHL Entry Draft, Tryamkin was selected 66th overall by the Vancouver Canucks. On 8 March 2016 the Canucks signed Tryamkin to a two-year entry-level deal. In this deal Tryamkin had the option of going back to Russia and not the AHL if he did not make the Canucks in the following season.

He immediately joined the Canucks for the remainder of the 2015–16 season, and on 16 March 2016, Tryamkin made his NHL debut against the Colorado Avalanche and scored his 1st NHL point assisting on Henrik Sedin's goal. On 7 April 2016, Tryamkin scored his first career NHL goal against the Calgary Flames goaltender Joni Ortio.

Tryamkin made the Canucks 2016–17 season-opening roster but was unable to draw into the lineup. The Canucks reportedly attempted to send him to their AHL affiliate, the Utica Comets, but Tryamkin declined – using his contract option in forcing them to keep him on their roster or allow him to return to Russia. Tryamkin eventually made his season debut on 3 November, after being a healthy scratch in the team's first 10 games of the season. Tryamkin remained in the defense corps for the remainder of the season, appearing in 66 games for 2 goals and 9 points.

Unhappy with his role and ice-time within the Canucks blueline, as a restricted free agent, on April 20, 2017 it was announced that Tryamkin was returning to Russia to play for Avtomobilist Yekaterinburg.

Career statistics

Regular season and playoffs

International

References

External links
 

1994 births
Living people
Avtomobilist Yekaterinburg players
JHC Avto players
Russian ice hockey defencemen
Sportspeople from Yekaterinburg
Vancouver Canucks draft picks
Vancouver Canucks players